The Conflicts of Life is a 1913 Swedish silent drama film directed by Victor Sjöström and Mauritz Stiller.

Cast
 Nils Ahrén as Charles von Barton
 Ivar Kåge as Carsten Berner
 Richard Lund as Berchtold
 Greta Pfeil as Lila
 Victor Sjöström as Otto Berner
 Jenny Tschernichin-Larsson as Mrs. von Barton

References

External links

1913 films
1910s Swedish-language films
Swedish black-and-white films
1913 drama films
Swedish silent films
Films directed by Victor Sjöström
Films directed by Mauritz Stiller
Swedish drama films
Silent drama films